Mumbai International Arbitration Centre is an autonomous institution formed as system for alternate dispute resolution and act as arbitrator or mediator in case of international commercial transactions. The channel helps in enforcing the right of individuals under segment 89 of Civil Procedure Code, 1908 to exercise right for out of court settlement in case such possibility exists.

History and Objective 

Mumbai International Arbitration Centre was started in 2016 for resolving international disputes on commercial litigations except relating to tax and intellectual property can be resolved through arbitration and mediation.

Aims 

Mumbai International Arbitration Centre has been set up aimed with the following-

 Helps in settling international disputes which involves Indian companies.

 Helps in Easing of doing business in the country.

 Cost efficient for settling disputes as it can be settled in the country.

 Cities act as neutral place with arbitrators having best professional experience in International standards.

 Dispute to be resolved in 12 months from date of filing.

Members 

There are 18 members as Arbitrators in Mumbai International Arbitration Centre and 9 out of them are from other countries.

Procedure 

The rules for Mumbai Centre for International Arbitration (MCIA) lays down following procedure for arbitration process

 Application for dispute resolution to be made to Central Government.

 Arbitrator from Mumbai Centre for International Arbitration (MCIA) finalises day of hearing.

 After hearing and cross examination from parties to dispute, ruling is made.

 A standard percentage of fees is fixed by the Institution after claims and counter claims, which includes cost of the arbitrator and amount payable to the centre.

Challenges 

The awareness on Mumbai International Arbitration Centre as institution is less in general public and also it needs skilled people,financial support and staff are lacking.

See Also 

 Dispute resolution

References

External links 
 Official Website

Arbitration organizations
Non-profit organisations based in India
Dispute resolution